

The following lists events that happened during 1946 in Afghanistan.

Incumbents
 Monarch – Mohammed Zahir Shah
 Prime Minister – Mohammad Hashim Khan (until 9 May), Shah Mahmud Khan (starting 9 May)

May 1946
Sardar Shah Mahmud succeeds Sardar Mohammad Hashim as prime minister. This change of government, after a period of 17 years without change, leads to the proclamation of a general amnesty for political prisoners and the setting up of a high court of justice for the trial of future political offenders.

June 5, 1946
Afghanistan applies for membership in the United Nations. This is approved on August 29, and Afghanistan is formally admitted as a member by the Assembly on November 19.

June 13, 1946
An agreement is signed in Moscow by Vyacheslav Molotov and Sultan Ahmad Khan, Afghan ambassador, reestablishing the frontier which had existed between Afghanistan and imperial Russia; the new treaty concerns the frontier line along the Penj and Oxus rivers and provides for the incorporation in the U.S.S.R. of the Kashka district, ceded to Afghanistan in 1921.

1946
The women's movement in Afghanistan is resumed by the foundation of Women's Welfare Association, the first women's organisation in Afghanistan since the Anjuman-i Himayat-i-Niswan.

References

 
Afghanistan
Years of the 20th century in Afghanistan
Afghanistan
1940s in Afghanistan